"Bull-E" is the twenty-first episode of the twenty-sixth season of the American animated television series The Simpsons, and the 573rd overall episode of the series. It originally aired on the Fox network in the United States on May 10, 2015.

The title is a reference to the Pixar movie WALL-E.

Plot
Bart is not excited about going to his first school dance, but after he accidentally destroys the orange drink machine that Nelson's mom's fiancé brought over, a 5th grade girl is impressed and asks him to dance. Bart then wins the "Best Dancer" trophy and his date asks him to meet her outside, but the bullies are waiting for him and they break his trophy and mock him, leading his date to desert him. After a humiliated Bart tells Marge about the incident, she goes to a City Council meeting and says it is time to make bullies feel scared instead of their victims, and a bill giving the police wide powers to crack down on bullying is passed unanimously.

Chief Wiggum starts out by legitimately arresting bullies like Jimbo, Kearney, and Dolph after they try to steal Bart and Milhouse's sleds. However due to how vaguely the law defines a bully, Wiggum soon begins to arrest anyone he wants to even if they are wrongly accused. Homer, who has abused the new law on anyone who even mildly inconveniences him, gets a taste of his own medicine when Rod and Todd Flanders, fed up with how Homer treats their father Ned, have him arrested and sentenced to 90 days of treatment. While in the center, Homer has an epiphany that he is cruel to Ned because his neighbor is better than him in every way. A distraught Homer begs for forgiveness which an angry Ned refuses several times for how he treated him. But after Homer penitently kneels on Ned's lawn for a long stretch, Ned reluctantly forgives him. The Simpsons and the Flanders then join together and have brunch.

Reception
The episode received a 1.2 rating and was watched by a total of 2.77 million people, making it the most watched show on Fox that night.

Dennis Perkins of The A.V. Club gave the episode a B, saying "since the Homer-Flanders dynamic can only stretch so far—Flanders has to stay Flanders, Homer Homer—an episode that sets out to seek an emotionally satisfying rapprochement between the two has to earn its eventual big moment, and "Bull-E" comes up just short."

Stacy Glanzman of TV Fanatic gave the episode 4.5/5.

References

External links 
 
 "Bull-E" at theSimpsons.com

2015 American television episodes
The Simpsons (season 26) episodes
Television episodes about bullying